Sin Miedo (del Amor y Otros Demonios) (stylized as Sin Miedo (del Amor y Otros Demonios) ∞) is the second studio album and first Spanish album by American singer Kali Uchis, released on November 18, 2020, through Interscope Records and EMI Records. The album, which is Uchis' first record predominantly sung in Spanish, was supported by three singles, "Aquí Yo Mando" with Rico Nasty, "La Luz" with Jhay Cortez, and "Telepatía". The album was also preceded by the promotional single "Te Pongo Mal (Préndelo)" with Jowell & Randy. The album features guest appearances from PartyNextDoor, Rico Nasty, Cortez, and Jowell & Randy. The album peaked at number 52 on the Billboard 200.

An acoustic EP of Sin Miedo was released on June 4, 2021.

The album was nominated for the first ever Grammy Award for Best Música Urbana Album at the 64th Annual Grammy Awards, as well as Favorite Latin Album at the American Music Awards of 2021.

Uchis officially announced the end of the Sin Miedo era on October 4 2021 through an Instagram post, the caption was the following: "end of sin miedo era felt cute gracias a dios fue mejor with SZA out nowww".

Background
In December 2019, Uchis released the intended lead single from the album, "Solita", which would later be demoted to a stand-alone single. In April 2020, the EP, To Feel Alive, was released as Uchis was not able to issue her second studio album. The EP was recorded entirely in isolation amidst the COVID-19 pandemic. Uchis announced the album through her social medias, alongside its cover art, title and guest appearances on November 5, 2020.

Uchis compared the creation of Sin Miedo to that of her previous album. "I traveled the world to make both [...] I started production in Miami, then I came to Los Angeles, and then I refined most of the finishes in London." She also had to convince her label about the album, since her contract only allowed her to release music in English.

The title of the album is a reference to the 1994 novel Of Love and Other Demons by the Colombian author Gabriel García Márquez.

Singles
"Aquí Yo Mando" with Rico Nasty was released on August 7, 2020, with a music video following on August 10. "La Luz" with Jhay Cortez was released on October 1, 2020. A music video was released on October 27. Following viral success on the social media platform TikTok, "Telepatía" was released as the third single from the album. The song impacted Italian and American contemporary hit radio on February 26, 2021, and April 6, 2021, respectively. A music video was released on March 18, 2021, directed by Uchis herself and taking place in Colombia. In promotion for the song, Uchis performed "Telepatía" on The Tonight Show Starring Jimmy Fallon on April 8, 2021. The song later peaked at number one on the US Hot Latin Songs Chart and number 25 on the Billboard Hot 100. On September 29, 2021, a remix of "Fue Mejor" featuring SZA instead of PartyNextDoor was released as a single, alongside its music video.

Promotional singles
"Te Pongo Mal (Préndelo)" with Jowell & Randy was released on November 17, 2020, as the album's sole promotional single.

Critical reception

Sin Miedo (del Amor y Otros Demonios) received generally positive reviews. At Metacritic, which assigns a normalized rating out of 100 to reviews from mainstream publications, the album received an average score of 78, based on four reviews, indicating "generally favorable reviews".

Reviewing the album for AllMusic, Thom Jurek declared that, "Uchis is fearless in stretching her sound past funky breaks, slippery R&B, and spaced-out jazz tropes to offer bracing evolutionary conceptions of reggaeton, cumbia, and boleros, seamlessly juxtaposing them with her own brand of Latin pop, jazz, and soul." Rhian Daly of NME wrote that Uchis "oozes effortless confidence as she follows her songs down an eclectic map of trails. Language barrier or not, it’s a divine second album". Jenzia Burgos of Pitchfork wrote that the album "instead of only containing the funky breaks and trippy jazz stylings that Anglo-market listeners have come to recognize her music for, Uchis sharpens the spotlight on her bilingual, binational Latinx repertoire".

Oliver Corrigan of Gigwise said that "Whilst many patches of Uchis' romantic garden fail to blossom, moments of musical experimentation prove greater than the sum of their parts. Uchis' affirmation against predictability certainly rings true here, even against the lauded impressions on her debut LP of 2018." Rachel Aroesti of The Observer was a bit more reserved in her praise, adding that the album "doesn't feel much like Uchis's artistic step-up, her Norman Fucking Rockwell or El Mal Querer, but more like a suck-it-and-see step on – a hastily released album that suggests her best is yet to come." David Smyth was also ambivilent with regards to the album, declaring "It sends a beautiful atmosphere out into a room, her voice breathy and unshowy, the bass an appealing throb, ticking Latin beats causing heads to nod without moving the feet excessively," and concluded that, "Overall this is a pleasant place to be. That breakout moment will come another time."

The album placed on Los Angeles Times and Varietys lists of the best albums of 2020, at number nine and number seven respectively.

Track listing

Notes
  indicates an additional producer
 All tracks are stylized in all lowercase
 "Aguardiente y Limón" is stylized as "//aguardiente y limón %ᵕ‿‿ᵕ%"
 "Que Te Pedí" is stylized as "que te pedí//"
 "Aquí Yo Mando" was track four on the initial track listing of the album but it ended up being the 10th track in the final version.
 "La Luna Enamorada" is a cover of "La Luna En Tu Mirada" by Luis Chanivecky

Credits and personnel
Credits are adapted from Tidal.

Musicians

 Kali Uchis – vocals
 PartyNextDoor – vocals 
 Josh Crocker – piano , flute , harp , bass , drums , guitar , keyboards , percussion , strings , vibraphone 
 Rico Nasty – vocals 
 Flikka – additional vocals 
 Joe Harris – guitar 
 Tom Henry – keyboards 
 Hailey Niswanger – saxophone 
 Ariel Shrum – trombone , trumpet 
 Jowell & Randy – vocals 
 Jhay Cortez – vocals 
 Mauricio Guerrero – guitar

Technical

 Prash "Engine-Earz" Mistry – mixer , mastering engineer 
 Austen Jux-Chandler – recording engineer , vocal producer , engineer 
 Liz Robson – recording engineer 
 Ethan Shumaker – recording engineer 
 Yakob – recording engineer 
 Chris Gehringer – mastering engineer 
 Will Quinnell – mastering engineer , assistant mastering engineer

Artwork

 Jora Frantzis – photography
 Iggy Rosales – hair styling
 Aleali – hair styling
 Priscilla Ono – make-up artist

Charts

Weekly charts

Year-end charts

Certifications

Release history

References 

2020 albums
Albums produced by Supa Dups
Kali Uchis albums
Spanish-language albums